Scott Bennett (born 8 January 1980) is a former Australian rules footballer who played with the West Coast Eagles in the Australian Football League (AFL).

Bennett appeared in just one senior game for the Eagles, against Melbourne at Docklands. He had four kicks, four handballs, took one mark and laid three tackles.

Mostly used a wingman and half back, Bennett played with three WAFL clubs.

After being out for four seasons, he made a return to the league in 2006 when he turned out for Peel Thunder.

References

External links
 
 

1980 births
Australian rules footballers from Western Australia
West Coast Eagles players
East Fremantle Football Club players
Claremont Football Club players
Peel Thunder Football Club players
Living people